Tsunyidiscus is a trilobite belonging to the Suborder Eodiscina. Tsunyidiscus appeared near the end of the Lower Cambrian, during the late Atdabanian stage of geologic time and some collections suggest it may have survived into the Botomian. The genus is very small (up to 7mm), oculate and isopypous with a narrow dome-shaped glabella and a narrow bullet-shaped pygidial axis. Thorax consists of three segments. Tsunyidiscus is the only genus currently attributed to the family Tsunyidiscidae.

Description 
Like other Agnostida the exoskeleton of Tsunyidiscus is diminutive and isopygous with 3 fulcrate thoracic segments. The cephalon has a strongly parabolic outline and maximum width (tr.) usually anterior to the genal angles. Glabella extremely narrow, lateral glabellar furrows usually obscure, with a rounded and expanded frontal glabellar lobe. The occipital ring (LO) is at least as long as L1, usually expanded laterally, and may bear a sharp posteriorly directed spine. Long, curved posterior fixigenal spines may be present. The occipital furrow is transverse and uninterrupted. Facial sutures proparian. Librigenae are 0.5% as long as the cephalon. The pygidium has a narrow multi=segmented axis (with five, six or more segments). The thoracic and pygidial axial segments may carry nodes.

Species and distribution 

 Tsunyidiscus aclis (Zhou, 1975)
= Emeidiscus planilimbatus, Mianxiandiscus badaowanensis, M. emeiensis, M. gaoqiaoensis, M. jinningensis, M. sichuanensis
Collected in the Lower Cambrian of China (Atdabanian: Jinning, 24.7° N, 102.7° E and Maotianshan 24.0°N, 102.0°E, Yuanshan Formation, Yunnan).
 Tsunyidiscus acutus (Sun, 1983)
Present in the Lower Cambrian of China (Atdabanian, Shuijingtuo Formation, Yichang and Zgui, Yangtze Gorge Area, Hubei, 111°E, 30.5°N)
 Tsunyidiscus armatus (Zhang & Zhu, 1980)
Occurs in the Lower Cambrian of China (Atdabanian: Weng'an, Longshancun Section, Niutitang Formation, Guizhou, 27.1°N, 107.5°E)
 Tsunyidiscus chintingshanensis (Lu, 1942)
= T. kaiyangensis, Eodiscus chintingshanensis, Guizhoudiscus chintingshanensis, G. kaiyangensis, H. chintingshanensis
Occurs in the Lower Cambrian of China (Zhongxin).
 Tsunyidiscus limbanodus Qian in Zhang et al., 1980
 Tsunyidiscus longquanensis (Zhang and Zhu in Zhang et al., 1980)
= Shizhudiscus longquanensis
 Tsunyidiscus niutitangensis (Chang, 1964)
= Hebediscus niutitangensis
Known from the Lower Cambrian of China (Atdabanian: Jinning, 24.7° N, 102.7° E and Malong, 25.4° N, 103.4° E, Yuanshan Formation, Yunnan; Zhijin, Gezhongwu Section, and Weng'an, Longshancun Section, Niutitang Formation, GuiZhou, 26.7°N, 105.8°E.
 Tsunyidiscus pengshuiensis Zhang & Clarkson, 2012 was extracted from the Lower Cambrian of China (Qiongzhusi Formation).
 Tsunyidiscus pertenus Lin et al., 2004
= T. orientalis, Hebediscus orientalis, Hupeidiscus orientalis
Found in the Lower Cambrian of China (Atdabanian: Huanglian Member, Jiumenchong Formation, 28.2°N, 109.2°E, Taijiang, Wuhe Member, Jiumenchong and Bianmachong Formations, 26.7° N, 108.3° E); Botomian: Weng'an, Longshancun Section, Mingxinsi Formation, Guizhou, 27.1°N, 107.5°E; Atdabanian: Pangwangcun Member, Huangboling Formation, Anhui, 30.1°N, 117.0°E
 Tsunyidiscus yanjiazhiensis S. Zang et al. in Yin and Li, 1978
 Tsunyidiscus sp.
Present in the Lower Cambrian of China (Atdabanian: Shuijingtuo Formation, Yangtze Gorge, Hubei, 30.8° N, 111.3° E).

Taxonomy

Ancestors 
Tsunyidiscus is the oldest known eodiscoid. The glabella of Tsunyidiscus is extremely similar to that of Dipharus clarki, and distinct from all other eodiscoids. D. clarki is thought to represent an immature stage of the redlichioid Bulaiaspis rather than an eodiscoid. This is because of the dominant palpebroocular ridges, extremely long librigenae, and free pleural tips on the pygidium of variable numbers of segments. In short: Tsunyidiscus is thought to have developed through paedomorphosis from Bulaiaspis.

Descendants 
Three lineages are thought to have evolved from Tsunyidiscus. First the Hebediscidae, that themselves gave rise to the Weymouthiidae, which contain Tannudiscus, the probable ancestor of the Agnostina. Second the Yukoniidae, who sprouted the Eodiscidae. And finally the Calodiscidae.

References 

Eodiscina
Cambrian trilobites
Fossils of China